is a railway station in Tsuchizaki Minato, Akita City, Akita Prefecture, Japan, operated by East Japan Railway Company (JR East).The station is also a freight depot for the Japan Freight Railway Company (JR Freight).

Lines
Tsuchizaki  Station is served by the Ōu Main Line, and is located 292.3 km from the starting point of the line at Fukushima Station.

There was a 1.8 km freight branch line from this station to Akita Port Station.

Station layout
The station has two unnumbered opposed side platforms serving two tracks connected by a footbridge. The station is attended.

Platforms

History
Tsuchizaki Station opened on 21 October 1902. The station was absorbed into the JR East network upon the privatization of JNR on 1 April 1987.

Passenger statistics
In fiscal 2018, the station was used by an average of 2076 passengers daily (boarding passengers only).

Surrounding area
 Japan Railway Tsuchizaki Factory
 Minato Castle
 Port of Akita
 Akita Port Tower Selion
 
 Tsuchizaki Post Office
 Tsuchizaki Library

See also
List of railway stations in Japan

References

External links

 JR East station information 

Railway stations in Akita Prefecture
Ōu Main Line
Railway stations in Japan opened in 1902
Buildings and structures in Akita (city)
Stations of Japan Freight Railway Company